Ransom Buffalow (1861–1922) was an architect in Jacksonville, Florida. Buffalow was born in North Carolina. He worked in Graham, Virginia, Seattle, Denver, and Knoxville before moving to Jacksonville in 1910. He designed several homes in the Riverside and Avondale Historic District neighborhoods and is known for his work in the Prairie School architectural style. He designed the Ransom Buffalow House (1922).

Works
William P. Baldwin residence at 1805 Copeland Street
Turner Z. Cason residence at 2331 River Boulevard (demolished)
2805 Riverside Avenue
2981 Riverside Avenue
Buffalow residence at 3305 Riverside Avenue (completed after his death)

References

1861 births
1922 deaths
19th-century American architects
20th-century American architects
Architects from Jacksonville, Florida
Architects from North Carolina